The Catharine E. B. Cox Award for Excellence in the Visual Arts is a biennial award given to a visual artist who is a former or current resident of Hawaii.  The recipient may work in any medium, and is honored with a solo exhibition at the Honolulu Museum of Art.  The award was established in 1985 by Charles S. Cox of La Jolla, California, Doak C. Cox of Honolulu and Richard H. Cox of Honolulu to honor their grandmother, Catharine Elizabeth Bean Cox.

Recipients of the award have been: 
 1990 Dorothy Faison
 1992 Michael Tom
 1994 Laura Smith
 1996 Shigeru Miyamoto
 1998 Hanae Uechi Mills
 2000 Renee Iijima
 2002 Yida Wang
 2004 Lonny Tomono
 2006 Ka'ili Chun
 2008 Leland Miyano
 2010 Sanit Khewhok
 2012 John Tanji Koga
 2015 Maya Lea Portner
 2017 Charles Cohan

Also see:
 Catharine Elizabeth Bean Cox

Footnotes

References
 Bean, Bernie, The Life and Family of John Bean of Exeter and his Cousins, Seattle, John Bean of Exeter Family Association, 1970.
 Ceramics Monthly, Mar. 1997, Vol. 45 Issue 3, p. 14.
 Sanborn, Curt, Hana Hou!, The Magazine of Hawaiian Airlines, Vol. 11, No. 4, Aug./Sept., 2008.

Visual arts awards
Hawaii art
Artists from Hawaii
Contemporary art exhibitions